The Prinsenhof ("The Court of the Prince") in the city of Delft in the Netherlands is an urban palace built in the Middle Ages as a monastery. Later it served as a residence for William the Silent. William was assassinated in the Prinsenhof by Balthasar Gérard in 1584 - the holes in the wall made by the bullets at the main stairs are still visible.

Since 1911, the building houses a municipal museum. Today, the building displays a collection of Dutch Golden Age paintings.

Gallery

References

External links
 | Prinsenhof municipal museum.
 

Rijksmonuments in Delft
Museums in South Holland